Passage is an outdoor 2014 art installation consisting of 38 weathered steel boat sculptures by Bill Will, installed along the MAX Orange Line in the Brooklyn neighborhood of southeast Portland, Oregon, in the United States.

Description
Bill Will's Passage consists of 36 weathered steel boat sculptures installed adjacent to MAX Orange Line tracks along Southeast 17th Avenue between McLoughlin and Powell boulevards. According to TriMet, which began installing the sculptures in March–April 2014, the "pieces draw on the natural history of the area while celebrating the Portland-Milwaukie light rail transit project's green street improvements in the corridor". The project's cost was not confirmed in TriMet's announcement.

See also

 2014 in art

References

2014 establishments in Oregon
2014 sculptures
Brooklyn, Portland, Oregon
Sculptures on the MAX Orange Line
Outdoor sculptures in Portland, Oregon
Sculpture series
Steel sculptures in Oregon
Weathering steel